Philip Frederick Margo (April 1, 1942 – November 13, 2021) was an American musician and author who was a longtime member of The Tokens, along with his brother Mitch.  They are best known for their hit recording of "The Lion Sleeps Tonight" which rose to #1 on the Billboard Hot 100 and remained there for three weeks in 1961.

Biography 
Margo was born in Brooklyn on April 1, 1942, to Leon and Ruth (née Becker) Margules. He was of Sephardi and Ashkenazi Jewish origin from The Ottoman Empire, The Austro-Hungarian Empire, and The Russian Empire.

Margo authored the 2010 science fiction novel, The Null Quotient.

He died at a hospital in Los Angeles, California, after suffering a stroke, on November 13, 2021, at the age of 79.

The Tokens 
In addition to his singing, Margo also played the drums. He performed with The Tokens on the following television programs:
The Tonight Show with Jay Leno
Late Night with Conan O'Brien
The Tracey Ullman Show

Record Production
With The Tokens, Margo was successful as a record producer for artists including the following:
The Chiffons
The Happenings
Tony Orlando & Dawn

References

External links
 

1942 births
2021 deaths
American television writers
Musicians from Brooklyn
American male singers
Record producers from New York (state)
American soul singers
The Tokens members
Singers from New York City
Writers from Brooklyn
20th-century American drummers
American male drummers
Screenwriters from New York (state)
American male television writers
20th-century American male musicians
American people of Sephardic-Jewish descent
20th-century American Jews
21st-century American Jews